George Harmon Lees was mayor of Hamilton, Ontario from 1911 to 1912.

External links 

Mayors of Hamilton, Ontario